Our Country (ND) is a Slovene political party founded by Aleksandra Pivec. The founding congress of the party was held on 20 March 2021, in Maribor. Due to the epidemiological situation, the program was conducted by videoconference, and 173 of the 210 invited party delegates were present. Pivec was elected the party's first president.

Pivec founded the party after a dispute in the Democratic Party of Pensioners of Slovenia (DeSUS), which she chaired for more than six months. The founding congress was attended by, among others, Anita Manfreda, Janez Ujčič, Danilo Burnač, Tina Novak Samec and Miha Recek. In the 2022 Slovenian parliamentary election, the party received 1.51% of the vote and fell below the 4% threshold required to enter the Parliament.

Party leadership 

 President: Aleksandra Pivec
 Vice President: Anita Manfreda
 President of the Party Council: Danilo Burnač
 Chair of the Supervisory Board: Lilijana Reljić
 Secretary General: Dejan Podgoršek

Electoral results

National Assembly

References

External links 
 Official website

Political parties established in 2021
Centrist parties in Slovenia
Centre-right parties in Europe
Conservative parties in Slovenia